There have been two baronetcies created for members of the Dashwood family, one in the Baronetage of England and one in the Baronetage of Great Britain. Both creations are extant as of 2008.

Dashwood baronetcy in Baronetage of England
The Dashwood baronetcy, of Kirtlington Park in the County of Oxford, was created in the Baronetage of England on 16 September 1684 for Robert Dashwood, later Member of Parliament for Banbury and Oxfordshire, with remainder, in default of male issue of his own, to the heirs male of his father. He was the son of George Dashwood, an Alderman of London and Commissioner of Revenue. George Dashwood was offered a baronetcy but did not take up the patent, and consequently a new patent was granted to his son. At the same time the widow of George Dashwood was granted the rank of a Baronet's widow.

Robert Dashwood was succeeded by his grandson, James, the second Baronet. He also represented Oxfordshire in the House of Commons.

On the death of James Dashwood in 1779 the title passed to his eldest son, Henry, the third Baronet. He was Member of Parliament for Woodstock for 36 years.

Henry's eldest son, George, the fourth Baronet, sat as Member of Parliament for Truro.

When George died in 1861 the title passed to his son, Henry, the fifth Baronet. He served as Lord-Lieutenant of Oxfordshire. See also the Dashwood baronetcy of West Wycombe below.

Several other members of the family may also be mentioned. Arthur Paul Dashwood (1882–1964), third son of the sixth Baronet, was an engineer and the husband of the novelist E. M. Delafield. Henry Dashwood, brother of the first Baronet, assumed the surname of Peyton in lieu of Dashwood. He was a Member of Parliament and the ancestor of Henry Peyton, who was created a baronet in 1776 (see Peyton baronets for more information on this branch of the family).

The Peyton baronets were in special remainder to the baronetcy of Kirtlington Park until the extinction of the title in 1962.

Dashwood baronets, of Kirtlington Park (1684)

Sir Robert Dashwood, 1st Baronet (1662–1734)
Sir James Dashwood, 2nd Baronet (1715–1779)
Sir Henry Watkin Dashwood, 3rd Baronet (1745–1828)
Sir George Henry Dashwood, 4th Baronet (1786–1861)
Sir Henry William Dashwood, 5th Baronet (1816–1889)
Sir George John Egerton Dashwood, 6th Baronet (1851–1933)
Sir Robert Henry Seymour Dashwood, 7th Baronet (1876–1947)
Sir Henry George Massy Dashwood, 8th Baronet (1908–1972)
Sir Richard James Dashwood, 9th Baronet (1950–2013)

Dashwood baronetcy in Baronetage of Great Britain
The Dashwood baronetcy, of West Wycombe in the County of Buckingham, was created in the Baronetage of Great Britain on 28 June 1707 for Francis Dashwood, a merchant and subsequently Member of Parliament for Winchelsea. He was the son of Alderman Francis Dashwood, brother of George Dashwood, father of the first Baronet of Kirtlington Park. He married Lady Mary, daughter of Vere Fane, 4th Earl of Westmorland and 7th Baron Le Despencer.

Sir Francis Dashwood was succeeded by his son from his first marriage, also named Francis, the second Baronet. He was a prominent politician and served as Chancellor of the Exchequer from 1762 to 1763, but is probably best remembered as the founder of the Hellfire Club. In 1762 Dashwood succeeded his uncle as eleventh Baron Le Despencer. He died without male issue in 1781 when the barony fell into abeyance (see Baron Le Despencer for further history of this title).

The baronetcy was inherited by his half-brother, John, the third Baronet. He assumed the additional surname of King.

For further history of the title, see the list of holders below. The Dashwood baronetcy of West Wycombe is the premier baronetcy in the Baronetage of Great Britain. The family seat is West Wycombe Park, West Wycombe, Buckinghamshire.

Dashwood, later Dashwood-King, later Dashwood baronets, of West Wycombe (1707)
Sir Francis Dashwood, 1st Baronet (c. 1658 – 4 November 1724), was a London merchant who made his fortune trading with the Far East. Francis used part of his wealth to buy the estate of West Wycombe Park, Buckinghamshire, and was created a baronet in 1707.
Sir Francis Dashwood, 2nd Baronet, 11th Baron Le Despencer (December 1708 – 11 December 1781), was an English rake famous as the founder of the Hellfire Club. He succeeded to the baronetcy in 1724. The height of his political career was his service as Chancellor of the Exchequer under Lord Bute. After leaving that post, the Barony of le Despencer was called out of abeyance for him (in right of his mother). However, he died in 1781 and was succeeded in the baronetcy by his half-brother John.
Sir John Dashwood-King, 3rd Baronet (4 August 1716 – 6 December 1793), was an English landowner. He was the second son of Sir Francis Dashwood, 1st Baronet, but the eldest by his third wife, and inherited lands in Lincolnshire and Wales from his maternal uncles, whose surname he adopted. John's interests lay largely in these lands, even after inheriting West Wycombe and the baronetcy in 1781.
Sir John Dashwood-King, 4th Baronet (1765 – 22 October 1849), was an English landowner, who succeeded his father in the baronetcy and inherited West Wycombe in 1793. Returned as Member of Parliament for Wycombe in 1796, he held that seat as a Tory until 1831. Bitterly opposed to electoral reform, he declined to contest the seat thereafter. Due to over-investment in local land, he died impoverished and left a heavily indebted estate.
Sir George Henry Dashwood, 5th Baronet (c. 1790 – 4 March 1862), was an English landowner and politician. A liberal Whig, he represented Buckinghamshire and subsequently Wycombe, as had his father Sir John. He liquidated his grandfather's estates in Lincolnshire and Wales in 1851, and used the money so raised to overhaul the estate at West Wycombe. He was succeeded by his brother John upon his death in 1862.
Sir John Richard Dashwood, 6th Baronet (c. 1792 – 24 September 1863), an English landowner, was the third son of Sir John Dashwood-King, 4th Baronet. He inherited the baronetcy from his brother in 1862, but died, unmarried and without issue, the following year.
Sir Edwin Hare Dashwood, 7th Baronet (7 September 1825 – 8 May 1882), was an English soldier and landowner. Raised to a military career, he served with distinction at the Battle of Sobraon, and subsequently became a sheepfarmer in New Zealand. He was the son of Capt. Edwin Sandys Dashwood (fourth son of the 4th Baronet) and Emily Hare. His father died of delirium tremens in Paris in 1835, and the younger Edwin was educated at a military school in Germany. He obtained an ensigncy in the 10th (the North Lincolnshire) Regiment of Foot, and went with them to India. There, he showed great gallantry at the Battle of Sobraon, planting the regimental colors in the Sikh trench-line. He shortly after left for England and exchanged into an English regiment. In 1848, Dashwood resigned his commission and emigrated to New Zealand, and bought a farm at Motueka and a sheep station near Blenheim on the Awatere River. In 1850, he and Captain E. M. Mitchell reconnoitered a route from Blenheim to Christchurch along the Waihopai River, which, however, proved unsuitable for sheep driving. Dashwood Pass, which he discovered during this expedition, now bears his name. During his time in New Zealand, Dashwood, like his father and uncle, became an alcoholic, perhaps in part because of the death of his beloved sister Amelia Caroline in 1847. In 1852, he visited England again and on 25 October 1853, married Roberta Henrietta (d. 11 November 1901), daughter of Sir Robert Abercromby, 5th Baronet and the couple had four sons:
Sir Edwin Dashwood, 8th Baronet
George Julius Hare Dashwood (19 August 1856 – 30 November 1878)
Sir Robert Dashwood, 9th Baronet
Francis Dashwood (18 August 1863 – 12 August 1932)
 They returned to New Zealand, where his sheep farming proved quite prosperous. In 1859, due to the illness of his uncle Sir George Dashwood, 5th Baronet, he sold off his New Zealand property and returned with his family to West Wycombe. He inherited that estate and the baronetcy in 1863 upon the death of his uncle, Sir John Dashwood, 6th Baronet. West Wycombe was to cause a great deal of trouble for Dashwood: Lady Elizabeth Dashwood, Sir George's widow, had been given life tenancy of the property and inherited most of his personal effects. Agricultural depression in the 1870s made the estates still less renumerative, and Sir Edwin found himself financially strapped for the remainder of his life. He died in 1882 and was succeeded by his son Edwin in the baronetcy.

Sir Edwin Abercromby Dashwood, 8th Baronet (28 October 1854 – 7 April 1893), was an English landowner. Born in New Zealand, he went to England with his father, Sir Edwin Dashwood, 7th Baronet, in 1859, but returned to New Zealand as a kauri gum buyer in 1874. On the death of his father, he inherited the baronetcy and the decaying West Wycombe estate, but did not return to England until after he had married Florence Norton in New Zealand on 24 August 1889. The couple had one daughter, Florence Emily (11 August 1890 – 17 April 1969). He mortgaged the estate, but died suddenly in 1893.
Sir Robert John Dashwood, 9th Baronet (3 June 1859 – 9 July 1908), was an English landowner. Born in New Zealand, the second son of Sir Edwin Dashwood, 7th Baronet, he returned to England in infancy. In 1893, he unexpectedly succeeded to West Wycombe and the baronetcy on the death of his brother. The estate was then in a ruinous state, and he was forced to sell off more property and lease the family's London house. He married Clara Adelaide Ida Conyers Lindsay (d. 20 April 1945) on 25 July 1893 and they had four sons (the eldest and youngest died in infancy) and one daughter. He died unexpectedly in 1908.
Sir John Lindsay Dashwood, 10th Baronet (25 April 1896 – 9 July 1966), was an English landowner and soldier, the second son of Sir Robert Dashwood, 9th Baronet, whom he succeeded at the age of twelve. He served in the First World War, initially with 10th Battalion Argyll and Sutherland Highlanders in 1915, and then was attached to the Heavy Section Machine Gun Corps.  He was one of the first tank crews, commanding tank C13 during the first tank action near Combles on 15 September 1916. He continued to serve with the Tank Corps, ending the war as an acting major. He married Helen Moira Eaton, a Canadian and sister of novelist Evelyn Eaton, on 20 December 1922 and they had one daughter and two sons. He worked for the Foreign Office until 1927. After a brief stint as a stockbroker, he largely retired to his West Wycombe estate in 1930, although he served as Assistant Marshal of the Diplomatic Corps from 1933 until his death. When World War II broke out, he first served as a flight lieutenant with Balloon Command, but returned to the Foreign Office in 1942. Appreciating the historical importance of the house at West Wycombe Park (the family seat), if not the house itself, he gave the property to the National Trust in 1943, together with an endowment of £2,000. In 1944, he helped to investigate the CICERO espionage scandal. Dashwood was made a CVO in 1952, and appointed an Extra Gentleman Usher to the Queen in 1958.
Sir Francis John Vernon Hereward Dashwood, 11th Baronet (7 August 1925 – 9 March 2000), was an English landowner, known for his activities in restoring the family estate at West Wycombe. While at Eton he had carried off the top prizes in French and German, so, when he was rejected by the Grenadier Guards and other regiments because of his poor eyesight, he was assigned to the secret Bedford Japanese School run by Captain Oswald Tuck RN. He was on the 7th course there (March to September 1944) and came 3rd in the class. He was then sent to the Foreign Office decryption centre at Berkeley Street and later was posted to Mauritius as one of three Bedford graduates with both codebreaking and Japanese expertise. There he worked on intercepted Japanese signals until the end of the war. He briefly embarked upon a political career, contesting West Bromwich in 1955 and Gloucester in 1957 as a Conservative, but lost both times. On 3 May of that year, he married his first wife, the Welsh heiress Victoria Ann Elizabeth Gwynne de Rutzen (1933 – 26 June 1976), and they had three daughters and one son. He took over the management of West Wycombe from his father in 1963, and attempted to build a model village at Downley, but it proved financially unsuccessful. On 24 September 1977, he married his second wife, Marcella Teresa Scarafina (she had been married twice before). Through a variety of investments, Sir Francis was ultimately able to restore much of the estate and re-purchase many of the original furnishings before his death in 2000.
Sir Edward John Francis Dashwood, 12th Baronet (born 25 September 1964), is an English landowner, the only son of Sir Francis Dashwood, 11th Baronet. On 10 April 1989, he married Lucinda Nell Miesegaes and they have one daughter and two sons. He is the current occupant of West Wycombe Park, now in the ownership of the National Trust, the maintenance of which is supported by opening to the public and leasing the estate as a venue for filmmaking and entertainment.

The heir apparent is the present holder's eldest son, George Francis Dashwood (born 17 June 1992).

See also 
West Wycombe Park
Stanford Hall
Baron Le Despencer
Peyton baronets

Notes

References

Cokayne, George Edward (1906) Complete Baronetage. Volume V. Exeter: W. Pollard & Co. . pp. 2–4

Kidd, Charles, Williamson, David (editors). Debrett's Peerage and Baronetage (1990 edition). New York: St Martin's Press, 1990, 

Baronetcies in the Baronetage of England
Baronetcies in the Baronetage of Great Britain
Baronetcies created with special remainders
1684 establishments in England
1707 establishments in Great Britain